The Idarkopf near Stipshausen in the Hunsrück is a mountain, within the Idar Forest in the German counties of Birkenfeld and Bernkastel-Wittlich. It is one of the highest mountains in the state of Rhineland-Palatinate.

Geography

Location 
The Idarkopf lies in the northeastern part of the Idar Forest and within the Saar-Hunsrück Nature Park. Its summit rises around 2 km northwest of the village of Stipshausen (county of Birkenfeld) and 4 km southeast of the village of Hochscheid (Bernkastel-Wittlich). Whilst the summit and the southeastern flank of the mountain belong to Stipshausen, its western flanks up to the crest and northern to northeastern areas belong to the village of Weitersbach (county of Birkenfeld) which lies 3.5 km east-northeast of the summit (both distances as the crow flies). The Idarbach stream flows past the Idarkopf to the northeast.

Towers 
About 200 metres northwest of the summit of the Idarkopf at a height of 744.2 m stands the observation tower known as the Idarkopf Tower, from which there are views, for example, of the Taunus, the Donnersberg across the Hunsrück, to the Eifel and of the Westerwald. Around 300 metres northeast of the summit at a height of about 738 m stands a transmission tower.

References

External links 

 Idarkopf winter sports region

Mountains under 1000 metres
Mountains and hills of the Hunsrück
Birkenfeld (district)
Bernkastel-Wittlich